Kevin Peterson dos Santos Silva (born 7 September 1997), simply known as Kevin, is a Brazilian footballer who plays as a right back for Tombense.

Playing career
After being noticed by a scout, he was brought to a trial at Mirassol, where he was signed and after playing in a U17 tournament with the team was signed to his first professional contract.

In 2015, he joined Avaí, playing in their youth system.

Soon after, he was acquired by Tombense, who sent him on a series of loans over the next years.

First, he was loaned to Cruzeiro, where he stayed for two years, playing in their youth system.

From 2017 to 2018, he was on loan with Guarani. With Guarani, he won the Paulista Serie A2.

In January 2019, he went on loan with Goiás, on the recommendation of coach Maurício Barbieri.

In 2020, he went on loan to Grêmio, on a five month loan with the possibility of an extension for another year. He immediately joined the U23 side. At the end of the five-month loan, the option to extend was not picked up due to the interruption of the season due to the COVID-19 pandemic and the fact that he had aged out of the U23 side.

In July 2020, he joined Botafogo on loan through 2021.

On 31 May 2021, he joined Ponte Preta on loan.

In April 2022, he moved to Avaí on loan. He scored his first professional goal on 13 June 2022, in a 1-0 victory over Botafogo.

Career statistics

References

External links

1997 births
Living people
Brazilian footballers
Association football defenders
Campeonato Brasileiro Série A players
Campeonato Brasileiro Série B players
Mirassol Futebol Clube players
Tombense Futebol Clube players
Avaí FC players
Cruzeiro Esporte Clube players
Guarani FC players
Goiás Esporte Clube players
Botafogo de Futebol e Regatas players
Associação Atlética Ponte Preta players
Sportspeople from Piauí